Soraida Salwala founded the world’s first hospital for elephants in 1993, the “Friends of the Asian Elephant Hospital” in Thailand.

She is the Secretary-General at the hospital and feels connected to the sick elephants, many of whom were hurt from exploding landmines.

Salwala announced her resignation due to lack of funding for the hospital on Facebook in September 2017. Within days, more than Bt40 million was donated, and she was able to keep the hospital open.

The Eyes of Thailand is a 2012 documentary about two of the hospitalized elephants who had prosthetic legs created for them.

References 

Soraida Salwala
Animal welfare workers
Year of birth missing (living people)
Living people